The 1948 Murray State Thoroughbreds football team represented Murray State University during the 1948 college football season. In their first season under head coach Fred Faurot, the Thoroughbreds compiled a 9–1–1 record, won the Ohio Valley Conference (OVC) in their first year of its existence with a 3–1 record against conference opponents, and outscored their opponents by a total of 290 to 87. Murray State was invited to the 1949 Tangerine Bowl, where they tied undefeated Sul Ross.

Schedule

References

Murray State
Murray State Racers football seasons
Ohio Valley Conference football champion seasons
Murray State Thoroughbreds football